Miguel y William ( Michael and William) is a 2007 Spanish romantic comedy film directed by Inés París and starring Elena Anaya, Juan Luis Galiardo and Will Kemp. The film depicts a fictional meeting between William Shakespeare and Miguel de Cervantes in the early seventeenth century and their rival love for a woman. The dialogue is a mixture of Spanish and English.

Cast
 Elena Anaya - Leonor
 Juan Luis Galiardo - Miguel de Cervantes
 Will Kemp - William Shakespeare
 Josep Maria Pou - Duque
 Geraldine Chaplin - Dueña
 Malena Alterio - Magdalena
 Miriam Giovanelli - Consuelo
 Jorge Calvo - Sancho
 Carolina Lapausa - Juana
 Óscar Hernández - Médico
 José Luis Torrijo - Prior
 Juan Fernández - Iniesta
 Fernando Conde - Padre Leonor
 Roberto Cairo - Cómico director
 María Parra - Petronila
 Javier Aller - Bufón
 Oscar Mayer - Cuidador perros
 Denis Rafter - Vendedor Londres

References

External links
 

2007 romantic comedy films
2007 films
English-language Spanish films
Spanish romantic comedy films
2000s Spanish-language films
Cultural depictions of Miguel de Cervantes
Films about William Shakespeare
2000s English-language films
2007 multilingual films
Spanish multilingual films
2000s Spanish films